Sir James Hamilton of Cadzow, 5th Laird of Cadzow (before 1397 – c. 1440) was a Scottish nobleman and royal hostage.

Biography

The son of Sir John Hamilton of Cadzow and his wife, Jacoba Douglas, James Hamilton is first attested to in 1397. In a writ of that year, his father Sir John Hamilton granted him the lands and privileges of Kinneil, in return for the superiority of all property that had been promised to him through his marriage after his attainment of majority.

Hamilton next comes to notice in a Safe-conduct issued by Henry V of England to travel to Calthorpe Castle in Lincolnshire.

In 1424, Hamilton was one of the Scottish Lords allowed passage to Durham to visit the captive James I of Scotland. In the same year, he was one of many Scots hostages given to the English as security for the payment of the ransom of the newly freed King of Scots. His estate was valued at 500 merks.

Hamilton was confined first at Fotheringay Castle, then at Dover Castle. He appears to have been released by 1426. He was invested as a knight before 1430.

Hamilton died not later than 1441, when his son is described as Lord of Cadzow.

Marriage and children
James Hamilton married Janet Livingston before 1422, when he received a charter of the lands of Schawis from his father-in-law, Sir Alexander Livingston of Callendar. By Janet Livingston, Hamilton had six children:
James Hamilton, 6th Laird of Cadzow - later made a Lord of Parliament as 1st Lord Hamilton
Alexander Hamilton - ancestor of the Hamiltons of Silvertonhill
John Hamilton
Gavin Hamilton - ancestor of the Hamiltons of Dalzell
Agnes Hamilton - married Sir James Hamilton of Preston
Elizabeth Hamilton - married Chalmers of Gadgirth

References

Balfour Paul, Sir James, The Scots Peerage Vol IV. Edinburgh 1907 

14th-century births
1440s deaths
People from South Lanarkshire
James
Year of birth unknown
Year of death uncertain